Ju Sang-jeom (주상점, 15 September 1926 – 1981) was a South Korean boxer. He competed in the men's lightweight event at the 1952 Summer Olympics.

References

1926 births
1981 deaths
South Korean male boxers
Olympic boxers of South Korea
Boxers at the 1952 Summer Olympics
Place of birth missing
Lightweight boxers